Myrtillocactus cochal, the candelabra cactus (a name it shares with other plants), is a species of flowering plant in the family Cactaceae, native to Baja California. Individuals can reach , and are hardy to USDA zone 9b.

References

cochal
Endemic flora of Mexico
Flora of Baja California
Plants described in 1909